The Associação de Futebol de Beja (Beja Football Association) is one of the 22 District Football Associations that are affiliated to the Portuguese Football Federation. The AF Beja administers lower tier football in the district of Beja.

Background 
Associação de Futebol de Beja, commonly referred to as AF Beja, is the governing body for football in the district of Beja. The Football Association is based in Beja. The Association's President is José Mâncio Rosa Soeiro. The organisation was established on 30 March 1925.

The leading club up until 1945/46 was Luso Sporting Clube (known as Luso Beja) who won the District Championship on 19 occasions. The club was founded in 1916 and first won the championship in 1924/25 when it was run on an unofficial basis.

Competitions
Beja clubs compete in the third national level of the Portuguese football league system in Campeonato Nacional de Seniores, competition run by the Portuguese Football Federation. 

Below the Campeonato Nacional de Seniores the competitions are organised at a district level (known in Portuguese as Distritais) with each District Association organising its competitions according to geographical and other factors. The AF Beja runs two league competitions with the Division One (1ª divisão) being at the fourth level of the league system and Division Two (2ª divisão) at the fifth level.  At one time this second tier was divided into two groups (série A and série B) on a geographical basis.

In more general terms the AF Beja currently organises District Championships for football and Futsal for men and women for all age groups including Senior, Junior, Youth, Beginners, Infants and Schools.

Notable clubs affiliated to AF Beja

Segunda Divisão (tier 3)
 Moura Atlético Clube
 Clube Desportivo de Almodôvar

Distritais (tiers 4 & 5)
 Clube Desportivo de Beja
 Sport Clube Mineiro Aljustrelense

Current Divisions - 2011–12 Season
The AF Beja runs the following division covering the fifth and sixth tiers of the Portuguese football league system.

1ª divisão
Associação Juventude Desportiva Rosairense
Clube Atlético Aldenovense
Clube de Futebol Guadiana
Clube de Futebol Vasco da Gama
Clube Desportivo de Almodovar
Clube Desportivo de Beja
Clube Desportivo e Cultural de Panóias
Clube Desportivo Praia de Milfontes
Futebol Clube Castrense
Futebol Clube de São Marcos
Futebol Clube de Serpa
Sport Clube Odemirense
Sporting Clube de Cuba
Sporting Clube Ferreirense

2ª divisão
Alvorada Futebol Clube
Barrancos Futebol Clube
Centro de Cultura e Desporto do Bairro Nª Sª da Conceição
Clube Recreativo e Desportivo de Cabeça Gorda
Futebol Clube de Vale de Vargo
Grupo Desportivo Amarelejense
Grupo Desportivo Messejanense
Grupo Desportivo Renascente de São Teotónio
Negrilhos Futebol Clube
Ourique Desportos Clube
Piense Sport Clube
Sabóia Atlético Clube
Sociedade Recreativa e Musical Sanluizense

Former participants
Other clubs that have competed in the Distritais since the 1992/93 season include:

 Associação Cultural Desportiva de Santa Clara-A-Nova
 Associação Cultural e Desportiva de Penedo Gordo
 Associação Cultural e Recreativa Zona Azul
 Atlético Clube de Brinches
 Atlético Clube de Ficalho
 Beira Serra - Grupo Desportivo Recreativo e Cultural Naverredondense
 Centro de Cultura Recreio e Desporto de Santa Vitória
 Centro Cultural e Desportivo de Alfundão
 Clube de Futebol de Santo Aleixo da Restauração
 Clube Desportivo e Cultural de Pedrógão do Alentejo
 Clube Desportivo e Recreativo Salvadense
 Clube Desportivo de Garvão
 Futebol Clube Pereirense
 Grupo Desportivo Casa do Povo Ruins
 Grupo Desportivo e Cultural da Baronia
 Grupo Desportivo de Odivelas

 Grupo Desportivo e Cultural das Neves
 Grupo Desportivo e Cultural de Sete
 Grupo Desportivo e Cultural do Alvito
 Grupo Desportivo e Recreativo de Luzianes-Gare
 Grupo Desportivo e Recreativo de Faro do Alentejo
 Grupo Desportivo Sociedade Filarmónica 24 Outubro (Baleizão)
 Juventude Futebol Clube Boavista
 São Domingos Futebol Clube
 Sociedade Artística Almodovarense
 Sociedade Recreativa e Desportiva Entradense
 Sociedade União Recreativa Sobralense
 Sporting Clube de Peroguarda
 Sporting Clube Figueirense
 Sporting Clube Santaclarense
 União Desportiva Cultural Beringelense

Other clubs
Other clubs that are affiliated to AF Beja include:

 ASB Associação de Surdos de Beja
 Associação Cultural Juventude Almodovarense
 Associação Cultural Recreativa e Desportiva Zambujeirense
 Associação Cultural Recreativa Sadina
 Associação Desportiva de Vila Nova de São Bento
 Associação Jovens de Barrancos “Enguripitados”
 Barrancos Futsal Associação Desportiva e Cultural
 Casa de Cultura da Aldeia dos Fernandes
 Casa do Benfica em Almodôvar
 Casa do Benfica em Beja
 Casa do Benfica em Castro Verde
 Casa do Benfica em Moura
 Casa do Povo de Baleizão
 Casa do Povo de S.Matias
 Centro Cultural e Desportivo de Vila Alva
 Centro de Instrução Recreio Fernandense
 Centro Popular Trabalhadores - Clube Atlético Operário
 Clube Desportivo de Sobral da Adiça
 Clube Recreativo Cultural Gasparões
 Consol Futebol Clube Canhestrense
 Grupo D.S.R. União Vilafradense
 Grupo Desp. Soc. Filarmónica  Outubro de Baleizão

  

 Grupo Desportivo Casa do Povo de Alfundão
 Grupo Desportivo Casa do Povo de Beringel (Trigaches)
 Grupo Desportivo Casa do Povo de Safara
 Grupo Desportivo da Casa do Povo de S. Luís
 Grupo Desportivo do Roxo
 Grupo Desportivo e Cultural Aldeia de Ruins e Olhas
 Grupo Desportivo e Cultural das Neves
 Grupo Desportivo e Cultural do Alcoforado
 Grupo Desportivo e Recreativo de Amoreiras-Gare
 Grupo Desportivo Juvenil Casa do Povo Sª Luzia
 Grupo Desportivo Povoense
 Grupo Desportivo Tribunas
 Instituto Politécnico de Beja
 Mirante – Assoc. Juvenil Cultural Ambiental e Desportiva de Selmes
 Núcleo Sportinguista de Beja
 Núcleo Sportinguista de Moura
 Operário Futebol Clube
 Sociedade Recreativa Aldeia de Ruins
 Sociedade Recreativa Colense
 Unidos Futebol Clube Campo Redondo
 Vila Ruiva Futebol Clube

District Championships

Historic champions

Divisional champions

List of member clubs

Footnote
 1-10 games in Portuguese Cup.     *
 11-100 games in Portuguese Cup.  * *
 101+ games in Portuguese Cup.     * * *

See also
 Portuguese District Football Associations
 Portuguese football competitions
 List of football clubs in Portugal

References 

Beja

Sports organizations established in 1925